DDM may refer to:

Computing
 Data Diffusion Machine, a virtual shared memory computer architecture from the 1990s
 Digital diagnostics monitoring function in SFP transceivers
 Distributed Data Management Architecture, an open, published architecture for creating, managing and accessing data on a remote computer. 
 Dynamic Data Masking, a form of data masking
 Dynamic Device Mapping, an advanced technology for USB KVM switches

Science and technology
 Derrick Drilling Machine, or Top drive
 Difference in the Depth of Modulation, an amplitude modulation method used in the Instrument Landing System
 Differential dynamic microscopy, an optical technique
 Direct Digital Manufacturing
 Doctor of Dental Medicine, an academic degree for dentistry
 Domain decomposition methods
 Drift Diffusion Model, a method used in psychological choice testing
 Maltosides (n-Dodecyl β-D-Maltopyranoside), a detergent used when purifying membrane proteins
 Dyson Digital Motor, a two-pole switched reluctance motor

Finance
 Dividend Discount Model, a valuation method for shares based on dividends
 East German mark, a former currency (ISO code was DDM)

Other uses 
 Deutsches Dampflokomotiv-Museum, the German Steam Locomotive Museum
 Dharma Drum Mountain, a Buddhist educational foundation
 Didymoteicho, a Greek town
 Dubbeldeks Materieel, a class of trains in the Netherlands
 Dungeon Dice Monsters, a board game
 Dungeons & Dragons Miniatures Game, collectible tactical skirmish game